Dagai may refer to:

 Dagai, Buner
 Dagai, Mardan
 Dagai, Swabi